Dirty Dancing: The Time of Your Life is a dance show created for Living as a tribute to Dirty Dancing'''s 20th anniversary in 2007. Due to the success of the show, a second series was shown in 2008.

 Plot 
Sixteen dancers (twenty in series 2) from all over Britain compete for a dance contract with Los Angeles-based dance agency BLOC. The couples will stay at the Mountain Lake resort in Virginia. Each week they perform a dance in front of guests from the mountain lake resort and the judges. Each week the dancers pick a partner and perform a dance chosen by the judges. The judges then deliberate and choose that week's best couple and worst couple. The worst couple is then sent home.

 Series 1 
The judging panel for the first series consisted of three people:

 Miranda Garrison, Co-choreographer of the movie. She also starred as Vivian in the movie.
 Sean Cheesman, Top choreographer.
 Jennifer Ellison, Royal Ballet trained dancer and actress.

 Contestants 

 Amy Boyes & Jordan Darrell - Winners
 Alex Bryon & Jamie Karitzis - Runner up
 Jennifer Walsh & Andrew Stone - 8th
 Carly Baker & Kenny Solomons - 7th
 Sophia Hooper & David Lyons - 6th
 Dean Wills & Lucy Emes - 5th
 Lydia Louisa & Adam Pedicini - 4th
 Candice Greatbanks & Nick Giligan - 3rd

The series was commissioned by Clare Hollywood, with Glen Middleham as executive producer, Andrew Robertson as series producer, and Ed Sayer as series editor.

 Series 2 Dirty Dancing: The Time of Your Life'', series 2 was shown during the later summer of 2008. Filming began at the Mountain Lake resort on 1 June 2008. The series first aired on Wednesday 10 September, with the final on Wednesday 19 November 2008. Miranda Garrison and Sean Cheesman returned to the panel of judges, along with model and actress Kelly Brook.

In the first episode the boys arrived at Mountain Lake resort first shortly followed by the girls. When they all meet they had a few drink and fun and got to know each other. The first dance off was girls vs boys, in which they had to learn a routine from Shaun and also include some free style. For the Challenge they participated in a talent contest where they were not allowed to dance, won by Kade singing 'Ain't That a Kick in the Head', giving him first pick at the partner. He was also given immunity from the weeks dance off. In second place was Caoife who sang live, giving her second pick and in third place was Emma who did a striptease while using a hula hoop.

Contestants 

 James Collins & Pamela Smith - Winners
 Vincent Vianen & Caoife Coleman - Runner up
 Simon Campbell & Haley Monaghan - 3rd
 Alex Murdoch & Donna Gilkes - 4th 
 Tobias Mead & Emma De Vees - 5th
 Ashley Goddard & Kade Ferrido - 6th 
 Joel Hogan & Kirsty Bennie - 7th 
 Chantelle Prince & Dean James - 8th
 Jamie Greasley & Natalia Spano - 9th
 Johnny Byrne & Rachel Simmons - 10th

Since moving to LA Pamela has featured as a Dancer for such artists as Lady Gaga, Usher, Toni Braxton, Janet Jackson and Katy Perry. Caoife Coleman features in music videos for dance act Ultrabeat. Ashley Goddard can be seen in the 5th episode of Skins series 3. Alex Murdoch has featured in an advert for the Peugeot 107 Verve and went on to be a contestant in the 7th X Factor series as part of F.Y.D. Tobias Mead was featured in the first season of Britains Got Talent on 17 April 2010 and got through to the next round after dancing. Vincent Vianen did the choreography for both seasons of the Dutch version of So You Think You Can Dance.

References

External links 
Living - Dirty Dancing official site

Roanoke Times - Highlights from the 'Dirty Dancing' reality show, series 1
Miranda Garrison talks Dirty Dancing (Series 2)

2007 British television series debuts
2008 British television series endings
2000s British reality television series
Sky Living original programming
English-language television shows